Events in the year 1918 in British-administered Palestine (British-controlled part of OETA territory).

Events

 4 April – The first edition of the Hebrew-language daily newspaper "Haaretz" is published, sponsored by the British military government in Palestine.
 14 April - The Zionist Commission arrives in Palestine.
 8 May - First Muslim-Christian Association meets in Jaffa.
 June - First meeting between the Zionist leader Chaim Weizmann and the son of the Sharif of Mecca Hashemite Prince Faisal, who led the Arab forces in the Arab Revolt against the Ottoman Empire during the First World War, which takes place in Faisal's headquarters in Aqaba in an attempt to establish favourable relations between Arabs and Jews in the Middle East.
 24 July – Laying of the cornerstone of the Hebrew University of Jerusalem.
 19 September – 1 October 1918 - Sinai and Palestine Campaign: Battle of Megiddo.
 23 September – Sinai and Palestine Campaign: British occupation of Haifa is completed.
 30 October – Sinai and Palestine Campaign: the British Palestine campaign officially ends with the signing of the Armistice of Mudros and, shortly thereafter, the Ottoman Empire is dissolved.

Notable births
 4 January – Yossi Harel, Israeli military intelligence officer, pre-state Haganah member, a commander of many illegal Jewish immigrants ships headed towards Mandate Palestine, including the ship SS Exodus (died 2008).
 30 January - Meir Meivar, Israeli politician and businessman, Haganah commander during the Civil War in Mandatory Palestine (died 2000).
 10 October – Yigal Allon, Israeli politician, a commander of the Palmach, and a general in the IDF (died 1980).
 Full date unknown
 Yigal Hurvitz, Israeli politician (died 1994).

Notable deaths

References

External links

 
Mandatory Palestine
Years in Mandatory Palestine